Carlos Berlocq was the defending champion, but Simone Vagnozzi eliminated him in the second round.

Adrian Ungur defeated Stefano Galvani 7–5, 6–2 in the final to win the tournament.

Seeds

Draw

Finals

Top half

Bottom half

References
 Main Draw
 Qualifying Draw

Carisap Tennis Cup - Singles
ATP Challenger San Benedetto